Tappeh Rash (also Romanized as Tappeh-ye Rash) is a village in Marhemetabad-e Jonubi Rural District, in the Central District of Miandoab County, West Azerbaijan Province, Iran. At the 2006 census, its population was 644, in 151 families.

References 

Populated places in Miandoab County